Beşikli can refer to:

 Beşikli, Kahta
 Beşikli, Kemah